Patricio José Argüello Ryan (March 30, 1943 – September 6, 1970), known as Patrick Argüello, was a Nicaraguan American, member of the Sandinistas who was shot and killed while attempting to hijack El Al Flight 219 in September 1970,  as part of the Popular Front for the Liberation of Palestine's Dawson's Field hijackings. The Sandinistas had agreed to support the Popular Front for the Liberation of Palestine's hijacking in exchange for guerrilla warfare training.

Youth
Argüello was born in San Francisco, California in March 1943, the son of Rodolfo Argüello Ruiz,  a Nicaraguan national, and Kathleen Ryan, a US citizen.  His family moved back to Nicaragua when he was 3, and lived in Momotombo, La Paz Centro, and Managua. In 1956, Nicaraguan dictator Anastasio Somoza García was assassinated. His surviving sons Luis and Anastasio launched nationwide reprisals. Argüello's family were part of an exodus of affluent Nicaraguans who fled the country. They left for Los Angeles.

In Los Angeles, Argüello attended Belmont Senior High School. As he grew older, he became increasingly resentful of the Somoza regime. Like many youths of the 1960s, he was fascinated by the Cuban Revolution and the figure of Che Guevara. In the years following high school, he saw many of his friends in the student movement beaten, arrested or killed.

Adulthood
A graduate of UCLA, Argüello received a Fulbright scholarship to study medicine in Chile in 1967. This was during the time of political ferment that would culminate in the 1970 election of Socialist President Salvador Allende; Argüello was deeply affected by the deaths in August 1967 of several Nicaraguan friends who were members of the Sandinista guerrilla movement of Pancasan, as well as the death of Che Guevara in Bolivia two months later.

When he returned to Nicaragua, he attempted to collaborate with the Sandinista National Liberation Front.  However, Sandinista leader Carlos Fonseca distrusted Argüello's American background, suspected him of being an infiltrator, and had his participation limited.  Argüello was exiled by the Somoza government in August 1969 for his anti-regime activities. He went to Geneva, Switzerland to work with other exiled Nicaraguans.

In early 1970, Sandinista leader Oscar Turcios made contact with the Marxist Fourth International in Western Europe, in the hopes of meeting other guerrilla groups who could offer needed military training to the Sandinista's fledgling movement. The Sandinistas first made contact with Nayef Hawatmeh's Popular Democratic Front for the Liberation of Palestine (PDFLP). Argüello and several other Sandinistas were sent to PDFLP camps near Amman, Jordan to receive guerrilla training from April to June 1970. Two other Nicaraguans who trained with Argüello were Juan Jose Quezada (killed in Nicaragua in 1973) and Pedro Arauz Palacios (killed in Nicaragua in 1977).

In Leila Khaled's memoirs, it is alleged that Argüello fathered three children. However, in Marshall Yurow's biographical study of Patrick Argüello, he found no evidence to substantiate this claim.

In the summer of 1970, Argüello and a small group of Nicaraguan Sandinista émigrés made contact with a different faction of the Palestinian guerrilla movement, George Habbash's Popular Front for the Liberation of Palestine. The Nicaraguans wanted additional guerrilla training. The price the PFLP asked for the promised training was Nicaraguan participation in the simultaneous hijackings of four European airliners in a bid to draw attention to the Palestinian issue.

Hijacking

When two of their Palestinian co-conspirators were unable to board the targeted El Al Boeing 707 at Amsterdam on September 6, 1970, Argüello was left with only Leila Khaled, whom he had met only a week before and knew as Shadiah, to help him hijack the plane.  Posing as a married couple, they boarded the plane using Honduran passports—having passed through a security check of their luggage—seated in the second row of tourist-class. Just before they began their hijacking, Khaled told Argüello her actual identity, which impressed him. Thirty minutes into the flight, they drew their guns and approached the cockpit, demanding entrance.

The well-dressed Argüello reportedly threw his sole grenade down the airliner aisle, but it failed to explode, and he was hit over the head with a bottle of whiskey by a passenger after he drew his pistol. As the pilot threw the plane into a nosedive, throwing the hijackers off balance, Arguello fired his gun 3–5 times, wounding steward Shlomo Vider.

Khaled was also unsuccessful; unable to reach her own grenades concealed within her brassiere, she was beaten by the security and passengers, while the plane made an emergency landing at Heathrow Airport.

According to the passengers and sky marshals, Argüello was shot four times during this struggle, and died later of his wounds.  Argüello was dead by the time he and Khaled were in the ambulance en route to Hillingdon Hospital, after pilot Uri Bar-Lev refused orders to return to Israel due to his concern for the wounded steward.  His hijacking accomplice Khaled, who herself survived after being subdued by the passengers and security personnel, has at various times claimed he was shot after they failed to hijack the plane.

Legacy
In 1972, when the Japanese Red Army and PFLP attacked Lod Airport near Tel Aviv, the letter claiming responsibility for what it dubbed "Operation Dir Yassin" claimed that the attack had been carried by Squad of the Martyr Patrick Argüello – who had died two years earlier in the failed hijacking.

In the late 1970s, a small book publisher in San Francisco named itself the Patrick Argüello Press/People's Information Relay. It was noted chiefly for publishing a "Minimanual Of The Urban Guerrilla" and "Red Army Faction."  After its editors were arrested on unrelated charges, the company was dissolved.

In 1983, after the Nicaraguan revolution, the Sandinistas commemorated Argüello by renaming the geothermal plant at Momotombo in his honor. However, after the September 11, 2001 attacks, the Nicaraguan government of Arnoldo Alemán removed the name of the plant, claiming it was wrong to honor a terrorist.

The 1990s musical group Baader Meinhof wrote a song entitled "Kill Ramirez," which included the verse, "Patrick Argüello, Leila Khaled/disappeared into the tail end of the plane/said he's not one/of the brothers/good days bad days/they're all the same/Kill Ramirez el pirata."

Quotes
Leila Khaled spoke often of Argüello after the hijacking, stating that "Our rendezvous with history was approaching: all plans had to be translated into action; history was ours to write; Patrick Argüello was to write it in blood, I was not so honoured."

Ghassan Kanafani later spoke of Argüello, saying "The martyr Patrick Argüello is a symbol for a just cause and the struggle to achieve it, a struggle without limits. He is a symbol for the oppressed and deprived masses, represented by Oum Saad and many others coming from the camps and from all parts of Lebanon, who marched in his funeral procession."

References
 Marshall Yurow's Volcano's Edge: The Life and Death of Patrick Argüello Ryan

1943 births
1970 deaths
People from San Francisco
Belmont High School (Los Angeles) alumni
American people of Nicaraguan descent
Hijackers
University of California, Los Angeles alumni
Terrorism in Nicaragua
Deaths by firearm in London